Social exclusion or social marginalisation is the social disadvantage and relegation to the fringe of society. It is a term that has been used widely in Europe and was first used in France in the late 20th century. It is used across disciplines including education, sociology, psychology, politics and economics.

Social exclusion is the process in which individuals are blocked from (or denied full access to) various rights, opportunities and resources that are normally available to members of a different group, and which are fundamental to social integration and observance of human rights within that particular group (e.g., housing, employment, healthcare, civic engagement, democratic participation, and due process).

Alienation or disenfranchisement resulting from social exclusion can be connected to a person's social class, race, skin color, religious affiliation, ethnic origin, educational status, childhood relationships, living standards, and or political opinions, and appearance. Such exclusionary forms of discrimination may also apply to disabled people, minorities, LGBTQ+ people, drug users, institutional care leavers, the elderly and the young. Anyone who appears to deviate in any way from perceived norms of a population may thereby become subject to coarse or subtle forms of social exclusion.

The outcome of social exclusion is that affected individuals or communities are prevented from participating fully in the economic, social, and political life of the society in which they live. This may result in resistance in the form of demonstrations, protests or lobbying from the excluded people.

The concept of social exclusion has led to the researcher's conclusion that in many European countries the impact of social disadvantages, that influence the well-being of all people, including with special needs, has an increasingly negative impact.

Most of the characteristics listed in this article are present together in studies of social exclusion, due to exclusion's multidimensionality.

Another way of articulating the definition of social exclusion is as follows:

In an alternative conceptualization, social exclusion theoretically emerges at the individual or group level on four correlated dimensions: insufficient access to social rights, material deprivation, limited social participation and a lack of normative integration. It is then regarded as the combined result of personal risk factors (age, gender, race); macro-societal changes (demographic, economic and labor market developments, technological innovation, the evolution of social norms); government legislation and social policy; and the actual behavior of businesses, administrative organisations and fellow citizens.

Individual exclusion

Social exclusion at the individual level results in an individual's exclusion from meaningful participation in society. An example is the exclusion of single mothers from the welfare system prior to welfare reforms of the 1900s. The modern welfare system is based on the concept of entitlement to the basic means of being a productive member of society both as an organic function of society and as compensation for the socially useful labor provided. A single mother's contribution to society is not based on formal employment, but on the notion that provision of welfare for children is a necessary social expense. In some career contexts, caring work is devalued and motherhood is seen as a barrier to employment. Single mothers were previously marginalized in spite of their significant role in the socializing of children due to views that an individual can only contribute meaningfully to society through "gainful" employment as well as a cultural bias against unwed mothers. When the father's sole task was seen as the breadwinner, his marginalization was primarily a function of class condition. Solo fatherhood brings additional trials due to society being less accepting of males 'getting away with' not working and the general invisibility/lack of acknowledgment of single fathers in society. Acknowledgment of the needs participatory fathers may have can be found by examining the changes from the original clinical report on the father's role published by the American Academy of Pediatrics in May 2004. Eight week paternity leave is a good example of one social change. Child health care providers have an opportunity to have a greater influence on the child and family structure by supporting fathers and enhancing a father's involvement.

More broadly, many women face social exclusion. Moosa-Mitha discusses the Western feminist movement as a direct reaction to the marginalization of white women in society. Women were excluded from the labor force and their work in the home was not valued. Feminists argued that men and women should equally participate in the labor force, in the public and private sector, and in the home. They also focused on labor laws to increase access to employment as well as to recognize child-rearing as a valuable form of labor. In some places today, women are still marginalized from executive positions and continue to earn less than men in upper management positions.

Another example of individual marginalization is the exclusion of individuals with disabilities from the labor force. Grandz discusses an employer's viewpoint about hiring individuals living with disabilities as jeopardizing productivity, increasing the rate of absenteeism, and creating more accidents in the workplace. Cantor also discusses employer concern about the excessively high cost of accommodating people with disabilities. The marginalization of individuals with disabilities is prevalent today, despite the legislation intended to prevent it in most western countries, and the academic achievements, skills and training of many disabled people.

There are also exclusions of sexual minorities because of their sexual orientation, gender identity, and/or sexual characteristics. The Yogyakarta Principles require that the states and communities abolish any stereotypes about LGBT people as well as stereotyped gender roles.

Community exclusion
Many communities experience social exclusion, such as racial (e.g. black), caste (e.g. untouchables or dalits in India), and economic (e.g. Romani) communities.

One example is the Aboriginal community in Australia. The marginalization of Aboriginal communities is a product of colonization. As a result of colonialism, Aboriginal communities lost their land, were forced into destitute areas, lost their sources of livelihood, were excluded from the labor market and were subjected to widespread unpunished massacres. Additionally, Aboriginal communities lost their culture and values through forced assimilation and lost their rights in society. Today, various Aboriginal communities continue to be marginalized from society due to the development of practices, policies and programs that, according to J. Yee, "met the needs of white people and not the needs of the marginalized groups themselves". Yee also connects marginalization to minority communities, when describing the concept of whiteness as maintaining and enforcing dominant norms and discourse. Poor people living in run-down council estates and areas with high crime can be locked into social deprivation.

Contributors
Social exclusion has many contributors. Major contributors include race, income, employment status, social class, geographic location; personal habits, appearance, or interests (i.e., a favorite hobby, sports team, or music genre); education, religion, and political affiliation.

Global and structural
Globalization (global capitalism), immigration, social welfare, and policy are broader social structures that have the potential to contribute negatively to one's access to resources and services, resulting in the social exclusion of individuals and groups. Similarly, increasing use of information technology and the company outsourcing have contributed to job insecurity and a widening gap between the rich and the poor. Alphonse, George & Moffat (2007) discuss how globalization sets forth a decrease in the role of the state with an increase in support from various "corporate sectors resulting in gross inequalities, injustices and marginalization of various vulnerable groups" (p. 1). Companies are outsourcing, jobs are lost, the cost of living continues to rise, and the land is being expropriated by large companies. Material goods are made in large abundances and sold at cheaper costs, while in India for example, the poverty line is lowered in order to mask the number of individuals who are actually living in poverty as a result of globalization. Globalization and structural forces aggravate poverty and continue to push individuals to the margins of society, while governments and large corporations do not address the issues (George, P, SK8101, lecture, October 9, 2007).

Certain language and the meaning attached to language can cause universalizing discourses that are influenced by the Western world, which is what Sewpaul (2006) describes as the "potential to dilute or even annihilate local cultures and traditions and to deny context-specific realities" (p. 421). What Sewpaul (2006) is implying is that the effect of dominant global discourses can cause individual and cultural displacement, as well as sex safety are jeopardized (p. 422). Insecurity and fear of an unknown future and instability can result in displacement, exclusion, and forced assimilation into the dominant group. For many, it further pushes them to the margins of society or enlists new members to the outskirts because of global-capitalism and dominant discourses (Sewpaul, 2006).

With the prevailing notion of globalization, we now see the rise of immigration as the world gets smaller and smaller with millions of individuals relocating each year. This is not without hardship and struggle of what a newcomer thought was going to be a new life with new opportunities. Ferguson, Lavalette, & Whitmore (2005) discuss how immigration has had a strong link to the access of welfare support programs. Newcomers are constantly bombarded with the inability to access a country's resources because they are seen as "undeserving foreigners" (p. 132). With this comes a denial of access to public housing, health care benefits, employment support services, and social security benefits (Ferguson et al., 2005). Newcomers are seen as undeserving, or that they must prove their entitlement in order to gain access to basic support necessities. It is clear that individuals are exploited and marginalized within the country they have emigrated (Ferguson et al., 2005).

Welfare states and social policies can also exclude individuals from basic necessities and support programs. Welfare payments were proposed to assist individuals in accessing a small amount of material wealth (Young, 2000). Young (2000) further discusses how "the provision of the welfare itself produces new injustice by depriving those dependent on it of rights and freedoms that others have...marginalization is unjust because it blocks the opportunity to exercise capacities in socially defined and recognized way" (p. 41). There is the notion that by providing a minimal amount of welfare support, an individual will be free from marginalization. In fact, welfare support programs further lead to injustices by restricting certain behaviour, as well the individual is mandated to other agencies. The individual is forced into a new system of rules while facing social stigma and stereotypes from the dominant group in society, further marginalizing and excluding individuals (Young, 2000). Thus, social policy and welfare provisions reflect the dominant notions in society by constructing and reinforcing categories of people and their needs. It ignores the unique-subjective human essence, further continuing the cycle of dominance (Wilson & Beresford, 2000).

Unemployment

Whilst recognising the multi-dimensionality of exclusion, policy work undertaken in the European Union focused on unemployment as a key cause of, or at least correlating with, social exclusion. This is because, in modern societies, paid work is not only the principal source of income with which to buy services but is also the fount of individuals' identity and feeling of self-worth. Most people's social networks and a sense of embeddedness in society also revolve around their work. Many of the indicators of extreme social exclusion, such as poverty and homelessness, depend on monetary income which is normally derived from work. Social exclusion can be a possible result of long-term unemployment, especially in countries with weak welfare safety nets. Much policy to reduce exclusion thus focuses on the labour market:
 On the one hand, to make individuals at risk of exclusion more attractive to employers, i.e. more "employable".
 On the other hand, to encourage (and/or oblige) employers to be more inclusive in their employment policies.

The EU's EQUAL Community Initiative investigated ways to increase the inclusiveness of the labor market. Work on social exclusion more broadly is carried out through the Open Method of Coordination (OMC) among the Member State governments. The United Nations Sustainable Development Goal 10 is also an example of global initiatives aimed at promoting social inclusion for all by 2030.

Religion

Some religious traditions recommend excommunication of individuals said to deviate from religious teaching, and in some instances shunning by family members. Some religious organizations permit the censure of critics.

Across societies, individuals and communities can be socially excluded on the basis of their religious beliefs. Social hostility against religious minorities and communal violence occur in areas where governments do not have policies restricting the religious practise of minorities. A study by the Pew Research Center on international religious freedom found that 61% of countries have social hostilities that tend to target religious minorities. The five highest social hostility scores were for Pakistan, India, Sri Lanka, Iraq, and Bangladesh. In 2015, Pew published that social hostilities declined in 2013, but harassment of Jews increased.

Consequences

Health
In gay men, results of psycho-emotional damage from marginalization from a heteronormative society include suicide and drug addiction.

Scientists have been studying the impact of racism on health. Amani Nuru-Jeter, a social epidemiologist at the University of California, Berkeley and other doctors have been hypothesizing that exposure to chronic stress may be one way racism contributes to health disparities between racial groups. Arline Geronimus, a research professor at the University of Michigan Institute for Social Research and a professor at the School of Public Health, and her colleagues found that psychosocial stress associated with living in extreme poverty can cause early onset of age-related diseases. The 2015 study titled, "Race-Ethnicity, Poverty, Urban Stressors, and Telomere Length in a Detroit Community-based Sample" was conducted in order to determine the impact of living conditions on health and was performed by a multi-university team of social scientists, cellular biologists and community partners, including the Healthy Environments Partnership (HEP) to measure the telomere length of poor and moderate-income people of White, African-American and Mexican race.

In 2006, there was research focused on possible connections between exclusion and brain function. Studies published by both the University of Georgia and San Diego State University found that exclusion can lead to diminished brain functioning and poor decision making. Such studies corroborate with earlier beliefs of sociologists. The effect of social exclusion have been hypothesized in various past research studies to correlate with such things as substance abuse and addiction, and crime.

Economics 
The problem of social exclusion is usually tied to that of equal opportunity, as some people are more subject to such exclusion than others. Marginalisation of certain groups is a problem in many economically more developed countries where the majority of the population enjoys considerable economic and social opportunities.

In philosophy
The marginal, the processes of marginalisation, etc. bring specific interest in postmodern and post-colonial philosophy and social studies. Postmodernism question the "center" about its authenticity and postmodern sociology and cultural studies research marginal cultures, behaviours, societies, the situation of the marginalized individual, etc.

Social inclusion
Social inclusion, the converse of social exclusion, is affirmative action to change the circumstances and habits that lead to (or have led to) social exclusion.
As the World Bank states, social inclusion is the process of improving the ability, opportunity, and worthiness of people, disadvantaged on the basis of their identity, to take part in society. The World Bank's 2019 World Development Report on The Changing Nature of Work suggests that enhanced social protection and better investments in human capital improve equality of opportunity and social inclusion.

Social Inclusion ministers have been appointed, and special units established, in a number of jurisdictions around the world. The first Minister for Social Inclusion was Premier of South Australia Mike Rann, who took the portfolio in 2004. Based on the UK's Social Exclusion Unit, established by Prime Minister Tony Blair in 1997, Rann established the Social Inclusion Initiative in 2002. It was headed by Monsignor David Cappo and was serviced by a unit within the department of Premier and Cabinet. Cappo sat on the executive committee of the South Australian Cabinet and was later appointed Social Inclusion Commissioner with wide powers to address social disadvantage.  Cappo was allowed to roam across agencies given that most social disadvantage has multiple causes necessitating a "joined up" rather than a single agency response. The Initiative drove a big investment by the South Australian Government in strategies to combat homelessness, including establishing Common Ground, building high quality inner city apartments for "rough sleeping" homeless people, the Street to Home initiative and the ICAN flexible learning program designed to improve school retention rates. It also included major funding to revamp mental health services following Cappo's "Stepping Up" report, which focused on the need for community and intermediate levels of care and an overhaul of disability services. In 2007, Australian Prime Minister Kevin Rudd appointed Julia Gillard as the nation's first Social Inclusion Minister.

In Japan, the concept and term "social inclusion" went through a number of changes over time and eventually became incorporated in community-based activities under the names hōsetsu (包摂) and hōkatsu (包括), such as in the "Community General Support Centres" (chiiki hōkatsu shien sentā 地域包括支援センター) and "Community-based Integrated Care System" (chiiki hōkatsu kea shisutemu　地域包括ケアシステム).

one may explore its implications for social work practice. Mullaly (2007) describes how "the personal is political" and the need for recognizing that social problems are indeed connected with larger structures in society, causing various forms of oppression amongst individuals resulting in marginalization. It is also important for the social worker to recognize the intersecting nature of oppression. A non-judgmental and unbiased attitude is necessary on the part of the social worker. The worker may begin to understand oppression and marginalization as a systemic problem, not the fault of the individual.

Working under an anti-oppression perspective would then allow the social worker to understand the lived, subjective experiences of the individual, as well as their cultural, historical and social background. The worker should recognize the individual as political in the process of becoming a valuable member of society and the structural factors that contribute to oppression and marginalization (Mullaly, 2007). Social workers must take a firm stance on naming and labeling global forces that impact individuals and communities who are then left with no support, leading to marginalization or further marginalization from the society they once knew (George, P, SK8101, lecture, October 9, 2007).

The social worker should be constantly reflexive, work to raise the consciousness, empower, and understand the lived subjective realities of individuals living in a fast-paced world, where fear and insecurity constantly subjugate the individual from the collective whole, perpetuating the dominant forces, while silencing the oppressed.

Some individuals and groups who are not professional social workers build relationships with marginalized persons by providing relational care and support, for example, through homeless ministry. These relationships validate the individuals who are marginalized and provide them a meaningful contact with the mainstream.

In law
There are countries, Italy for example, that have a legal concept of social exclusion. In Italy, "esclusione sociale" is defined as poverty combined with social alienation, by the statute n. 328 (11-8-2000), that instituted a state investigation commission named "Commissione di indagine sull'Esclusione Sociale" (CIES) to make an annual report to the government on legally expected issues of social exclusion.

The Vienna Declaration and Programme of Action, a document on international human rights instruments affirms that "extreme poverty and social exclusion constitute a violation of human dignity and that urgent steps are necessary to achieve better knowledge of extreme poverty and its causes, including those related to the program of development, in order to promote the human rights of the poorest, and to put an end to extreme poverty and social exclusion and promote the enjoyment of the fruits of social progress. It is essential for States to foster participation by the poorest people in the decision making process by the community in which they live, the promotion of human rights and efforts to combat extreme poverty."

See also

References

Bibliography

 Alphonse, M., George, P & Moffat, K. (2007). Redefining social work standards in the context of globalization: Lessons from India. International Social Work.
 Applebaum, Richard P., Carr, deborah, Duneier, Mitchell, Giddens, Anthony. "Introduction to Sociology Seventh Edition" 2009.
Gilles Deleuze, A Thousand Plateaus, 1980.
Ferguson, I., Lavalette, M., & Whitmore, E. (2005). Globalization, Global Justice and Social Work. London and New York: Routledge Taylor & Francis Group.
Giddens, Anthony, Introduction to Sociology. New York: W.W. Norton &, 2009. Print.
Karl Marx, Economic and Philosophical Manuscripts of 1844
Frank Moulaert, Erik Swyngedouw and Arantxa Rodriguez. The Globalized City: Economic Restructing and Social Polarization in European Cities. Oxford University Press, 2003, 
Mullaly, B. (2007). Oppression: The focus of structural social work. In B. Mullaly, The new structural social work (pp. 252–286). Don Mills: Oxford University Press.
Power, A., Wilson, W.J., 2000, Social Exclusion and the Future of Cities, Centre for Analysis of Social Exclusion, London School of Economics, London
John Rawls, A Theory of Justice, 1971. 
 
Sewpaul, V. (2006). The global-local dialectic: Challenges for Africa scholarship and social work in a post-colonial world, British Journal of Social Work 36, pp. 419–434.
 Silver, Hilary (1994). "Social Exclusion and Social Solidarity: Three Paradigms". International Labour Review. 133 (5–6): 531–78.
 University of Georgia (2006, November 9). Social Exclusion Changes Brain Function And Can Lead To Poor Decision-making. ScienceDaily. Retrieved February 29, 2008, from http://www.sciencedaily.com /releases/2006/11/061108154256.htm
 URSPIC: An EU Research Project to measure impacts of urban development projects on social exclusion
Philippe Van Parijs, Real Freedom for All: What (if anything) can justify capitalism?, 1995. 

Yee, J. Y. & Dumbrill, G.C. (2003). Whiteout: Looking for Race in Canadian Social Work Practice. In A. Al-Krenawi & J.R. Graham (Eds.) Multicultural Social Work in Canada: Working with Diverse Ethno-Racial Communities (pp. 98–121). Toronto: Oxford Press.
Yi, Li. The Structure and Evolution of Chinese Social Stratification. University Press of America, 2005,

External links
Is the U.S. a Good Model for Reducing Social Exclusion in Europe? Center for Economic and Policy Research, August 2006
"Inclutivities" - A Collection of Games, Exercises and Activities for Use in Art Therapy and Training Programmes for Groups of Marginalised and Excluded Persons EU Project "Against Exclusion", 2014

Social philosophy
Political philosophy
Urban decay
Bullying
Sociological terminology
Shunning
Social inequality
Social rejection
Segregation
Discrimination